Kigoma District is one of the eight administrative districts of Kigoma Region in Tanzania. The district lies north of the city of Kigoma-Ujiji. Uvinza District, to the west and south of Ujiji, was split off from the Kigoma District in 1 July, 2013.

Geography 

It is bordered to the west by Lake Tanganyika. The district is bordered by Buhigwe District and Kasulu District to the east; Kigoma-Ujiji District and Uvinza District to the south.

Demographics 

In 2016 the Tanzania National Bureau of Statistics report there were 267,712 people in the district, from 211,566 in 2012.

The district is of the tribes of Waha, Wabembe, Wabwari, and Watongwe. Waha are the largest tribe, making up 95% of the people.

Administrative subdivisions 

Kigoma District was administratively divided into 16 Ward, 46 villages, and 212 hamlets.

Wards 

 Bitale (22,482)
 Kagongo (10,252)
 Kagunga (18,681)
 Kalinzi (30,188)
 Kidahwe (10,414)
 Mahembe (14,435)
 Matendo (14,306)
 Mkigo (7,478)
 Mkongoro (20,535)
 Mungonya (13,917)
 Mwamgongo (17,234)
 Mwandiga (20,810)
 Nkungwe (10,621)
 Nyarubanda (10,411)
 Simbo (34,838)
 Ziwani (11,110)

References

Districts of Kigoma Region